Gustav Wilhelm Körber (10 January 1817, Hirschberg – 27 January 1885, Breslau) was a German lichenologist.

He studied natural sciences in Breslau and Berlin, obtaining his PhD in 1839 with the thesis De gonidiis lichenum. After graduation, he served as an instructor at the "Elisabethanum" in Breslau, and from 1862, worked as a private teacher. In 1873 he became an associate professor at the University of Breslau.

Best known for his investigations of lichen species native to Silesia, he also examined specimens found in central and southeastern Europe as well as lichen collected from Mediterranean and Arctic regions. He published the exsiccata Lichenes selecti Germanici. The genera Koerberia (within the Placynthiaceae family) and Koerberiella (in the Lecideaceae family) are named after him.

Selected works
 Grundriss der kryptogamen-kunde, 1848 – Outline of cryptogamic species.
 Systema lichenum Germaniae: Die Flechten Deutschlands, 1855 – "Systema lichenum Germaniae": German lichens.
 Parerga lichenologica: Ergänzungen zum Systema lichenum, 1865 – "Parerga lichenologica": Supplement to "Systema lichenum".
 Lichenen aus Istrien, Dalmatien u. Albanien: (with Emanuel Weiss), 1867 – Lichens of Istria, Dalmatia and Albania.
 Lichenen Spitzbergens und Novaja-Semlja's, auf der graf Wilczek'schen expedition, 1872 – Lichens of Spitzbergen and Novaya Zemlya, from the Wilczek expedition.

See also
 :Category:Taxa named by Gustav Wilhelm Körber

References

1817 births
1885 deaths
German lichenologists
People from Jelenia Góra
People from the Province of Silesia
Academic staff of the University of Breslau
19th-century German botanists